Bletia parkinsonii is a species of orchid found in Guatemala and much of Mexico (from Chiapas to Nuevo León).

References

External links 

parkinsonii
Orchids of Guatemala
Orchids of Mexico
Plants described in 1839